The Italian general election of 1994 took place on 27 March 1994.

Results

Chamber of Deputies

Source: Ministry of the Interior

Senate

Source: Ministry of the Interior

Elections in Aosta Valley
1994 elections in Italy
March 1994 events in Europe